Phosichthys argenteus, the silver lightfish, a species of lightfish and the only member of the genus Phosichthys, is found in deep subtropical waters of all oceans, from depths of 500 to 2,000 m.  Its length is between 10 and 30 cm. They are bioluminescent fishes, possessing rows of photophores along their sides, with which they hunt planktonic invertebrates, especially krill.

References 

 
 Tony Ayling & Geoffrey Cox, Collins Guide to the Sea Fishes of New Zealand,  (William Collins Publishers Ltd, Auckland, New Zealand 1982) 
Photichthys argenteus in the collection of the Museum of New Zealand Te Papa Tongarewa

Phosichthyidae
Taxa named by Frederick Hutton (scientist)
Monotypic marine fish genera